Raquel Moore-Green is an American politician from the state of Oregon. A Republican, she was a member of the Oregon House of Representatives, appointed on July 23, 2019 by the Marion County Commission to replace Denyc Boles, after she was appointed to replace Jackie Winters in the Senate. She represented House District 19 which included Turner, Aumsville, and parts of Salem.

Moore-Green had previously worked on local campaigns, served as a legislative assistant, and owns a small business.

References

Living people
Republican Party members of the Oregon House of Representatives
21st-century American businesswomen
21st-century American businesspeople
Women state legislators in Oregon
Year of birth missing (living people)
People from Marion County, Oregon
Hispanic and Latino American state legislators in Oregon